The men's 5000 metres race of the 2015–16 ISU Speed Skating World Cup 3, arranged in Eisstadion Inzell, in Inzell, Germany, was held on 5 December 2015.

Jorrit Bergsma of the Netherlands won the race, while Sverre Lunde Pedersen of Norway came second, and Arjan Stroetinga of the Netherlands came third. Håvard Bøkko of Norway won the Division B race.

Results
The race took place on Saturday, 5 December, with Division B scheduled in the morning session, at 11:23, and Division A scheduled in the afternoon session, at 15:15.

Division A

Division B

References

Men 5000
3